The GY6 engine design is a  four-stroke single-cylinder in a near horizontal orientation that is used on a number of small motorcycles or scooters made in Taiwan, China, and other southeast Asian countries.
It has since become a generic technology. Kymco went on to produce Honda clones such as the Pulsar (CB125), made to Honda standards, as part of their range.

24- The four stroke engine for 125cc scooters. Honda's KCW125 (the commercial name in Japan is "Spacy") was modified by Taiwan's Kwang Yang Motor Co., Ltd. (KYMCO), under Honda's consultancy, and became a standard model called the GY6 which various Taiwan makers imitated and minor-changed. Apparently, vehicles of this model were imported from Taiwan by various manufacturers and traders, and spread mainly in the southern coastal regions of China.

Source link: https://ir.ide.go.jp/?action=repository_action_common_download&item_id=40179&item_no=1&attribute_id=26&file_no=1

Configuration
The GY6 single is forced air-cooled, with a chain-driven overhead camshaft and a crossflow hemi cylinder head. Fuel metering is by a single constant-velocity style sidedraft carburetor, typically a Keihin CVK clone or similar.
 
Ignition is by capacitor discharge ignition (CDI), with a magnetic trigger on the flywheel. Because the trigger is on the flywheel instead of the camshaft, the ignition will fire on both the compression and exhaust strokes, making it a wasted spark ignition. An integrated magneto provides 50 V AC power for the CDI system and 20-30 V AC rectified and regulated to 12 V DC for chassis accessories such as lighting, and to charge a battery.

It includes an integrated swingarm, which houses a centrifugally controlled Continuously variable transmission (CVT) using a rubber belt sometimes called a VDP.  At the rear of the swingarm, a centrifugal clutch connects the transmission to a simple integral gear-reduction unit.  There is no clutch of any kind between the CVT and the crankshaft; it is engaged via a centrifugal clutch at the rear pulley in the same fashion as Vespa Grande, Bravo and variated Ciao model, as well as Honda Camino/Hobbit scooters/mopeds.  An electric starter, backup kick-starter, and rear brake hardware is also housed in the swingarm.

References

https://ir.ide.go.jp/?action=repository_action_common_download&item_id=40179&item_no=1&attribute_id=26&file_no=1

Further reading
Chinese, Taiwanese & Korean Scooters 50cc Thru 200cc, '04-'09: 50, by Max Haynes and Phil Mather. Haynes Manuals. 2009.
Interfirm relations under late industrialization in China: the supplier system in the motorcycle industry; Volume 40 of I.D.E. occasional papers series. Moriki Ōhara. Institute of Developing Economies, Japan External Trade Organization. 2006. . p. 44, 53.  Full text at HighBeam Research
 The Little Book of Trikes By Adam Quellin. Veloce Publishing Ltd, 2011. . p. 64.
Scooters Service and Repair Manual. by Phil Mather and Alan Harold Ahlstrand. Haynes Manuals. 2006.

Honda
Motorcycle engines